The Cove Football Club is an Australian rules football club that was formed in 1983 and later joined the Southern Football League in 1984.  From 1984 to 2001, Cove played in the SFL Division 2 competition before joining the combined Division 1 in 2002.

The Cove Football Club continues to field teams in both Senior and Junior grades in the Southern Football League.

History 
The Cove Football Club was established in 1984 to cater the communities of Hallett Cove, Sheidow Park and Trott Park by a group of locals despite only planning a club around the early stages of building an oval. The first two seasons saw the newly formed club play as an 'away' team for each ground as they didn't have a secure oval and changerooms yet, with the players training at Morphett Vale. Early 1986 saw the completion of the ground and Cove having their own home ground.

The club has enjoyed a number of success throughout the senior and junior grades, with two A-Grade premierships in 1998 in Division 2 and again in 2008 in Division 1. 2013 saw founding club president Chris Galley's induction into the Southern Football League 'Hall of Fame.'

A-Grade Premierships 
1998 SFL Division 2
2008 SFL A-Grade

Greatest SFL Team 
To celebrate the 125th anniversary of the Southern Football League, each club was asked to name their "Greatest Team" whilst participating in the SFL.

References

External links
  Cove Football Club Website

 
 

 
 

Southern Football League (SA) Clubs
Australian rules football clubs in South Australia
1983 establishments in Australia
Australian rules football clubs established in 1983